The 2013–14 Lipscomb Bisons men's basketball team represented Lipscomb University during the 2013–14 NCAA Division I men's basketball season. The Bisons, led by first year head coach Casey Alexander, played their home games at Allen Arena and were members of the Atlantic Sun Conference. They finished the season 15–15, 10–8 in A-Sun play to finish in a three way tie for fourth place. They lost in the quarterfinals of the Atlantic Sun tournament to East Tennessee State.

Roster

Schedule
Sources
 
|-
!colspan=9 style="background:#; color:white;"| Exhibition

|-
!colspan=9 style="background:#; color:white;"| Regular season

|-
!colspan=9 style="background:#; color:white;"| Atlantic Sun tournament

References

Lipscomb Bisons men's basketball seasons
Lipscomb